Richard James Morrison (15 June 1795 – 5 April 1874) was an English astrologer, commonly known by his pen name Zadkiel and best known for the series known as Zadkiel's Almanac.

Early life
The son of Richard Caleb Morrison, Morrison joined the Royal Navy in 1806 serving as a first class volunteer until 1810, master's mate until 1815 and resigned due to ill-health with the rank of lieutenant in 1829. He then devoted himself to the study of astrology which he termed as astro-meteorology. He became a member of the Meteorological Society's Council in 1840.

Career
Morrison in 1831 issued The Herald of Astrology, subsequently known as Zadkiel's Almanac. In this annual pamphlet, he published predictions of the chief events of the coming year. Morrison wrote with the signature Zadkiel Tao-Sze. Morrison wrote such articles as The New Principia, or true system of astronomy, in which the Earth is proved to be the stationary centre of the Solar System (1868) which made him a charlatan in the eyes of scientists. In 1863 he won a libel suite against Admiral Sir Edward Belcher who wrote in the Daily Telegraph that Morrison was "the crystal globe seer who gulled many of our nobility about the year 1852". He was awarded twenty shillings (one pound) damages, but was deprived of his costs. The Athenaeum (16 May 1874, p. 666) noted that Morrison was “the restorer and Grand Master in this country of Tao-Sze, a secret society intended to be of immense power, and to outshine the Free- masons, but which, most probably, by his death, is reduced to two members, and inanition”.

Books
His works include:
Handbook of Astrology
Introduction to Astrology (1835) -- a re-edition of William Lilly's Christian Astrology.
The Horoscope
The Grammar of Astrology
Astronomy in a Nutshell.

References

External links
Comparison of methodology and accuracy of Zadkiel and the Met Office in the 19th century
Article placing Zadkiel in context of his time
 

1795 births
1874 deaths
English astrologers